Sapam Kunjakeswor Singh, also known as Sapam Keba, (born 1 January 1959) is a politician from the Indian state of Manipur. He is the incumbent MLA representing Patsoi Assembly Constituency in the 12th Manipur Legislative Assembly. He represented the Patsoi assembly constituency during 2007–2012 in the 9th Manipur Legislative Assembly.

In 2007, he won his maiden election as an Independent candidate by defeating the former Deputy Chief Minister and also the former Speaker L. Chandramani Singh by a margin of 1644 votes. He lost the 2012 election as an All India Trinamool Congress candidate. In 2017, he joined the North East India Development Party (NEIDP). He lost the 2017 election by a slimmest of margin of only 114 votes against a sitting Indian National Congress Minister.In the 2022 state Assembly election, as a BJP candidate he defeated the former INC Minister AK. Mirabai Devi.On 15 June 2022, Sapam Keba was appointed the Chairman of MANITRON (Manipur Electronics Development Corporation Limited).

Political career 

In the early 2000s, Sapam Keba and his team founded a political organisation called "Progressive Committee Patsoi Kendra". The goal of this organisation was to help augment the overall development of Patsoi assembly constituency. In the 2002 assembly election, this very organisation backed the CPI candidate Moirangthem Nabadwip Singh and eventually Moirangthem Nabadwip Singh won the Patsoi seat.

2002 

Clarion call from the supporters of Sapam Keba of actual contesting the election grew louder and stronger in the run-up to the 2007 assembly election. After much thought and deliberations, Sapam Keba took the plunge and announced his candidature for the 2007 Assembly Election. He took an independent stand and stood as an  Independent candidate. Amongst the candidates included the veteran politician, former Speaker and also the former Deputy Chief Minister Dr. L.Chandramani Singh and others. He won the election by a margin of 1644 votes and was termed as a "Giant Killer" by the local media.

2007 

 
Upon becoming the MLA as an independent candidate, the political force of Sapam Keba was not the strongest as the Government led by O. Ibobi Singh of the INC was in a comfortable majority with its allies. Since in the Centre, there was also the Congress-led UPA Government, the levers of power and patronage were in the hands of Congress politicians whether elected or otherwise. Projects proposed by Sapam Keba were put in the back burner and there was little to no support whatsoever from the ruling dispensation. On top of all that, the state machineries were in a constant hostile mode with Sapam Keba. 
Despite of all this, Sapam Keba performed admirably and the period of 2007-2012 saw a steady progress in the development of Patsoi Assembly Constituency.

2012 
The context of this 2012 election is based on the above facts among other factors. The other factors include, the strong wave of Congress in the state and Sapam Keba for this 2012 election was contesting against the Congress on AITC ticket. The number of votes Sapam Keba got in 2007 is almost the same as he got in 2012 implying that the people who voted for him in 2007 still trusted him in 2012 also. Another factor includes the anti-Sapam Keba votes combining and this posed a significant threat to Sapam Keba. The anti-Sapam Keba votes include the Communist votes as well as the votes from the Former Speaker L. Chandramani Singh who got more than 7000 votes in 2007 but was reduced to 2515 votes in the 2012 election. All these factors led to the defeat of Sapam Keba. 

After the defeat in the 2012 Election, Sapam Keba began looking for alternate political options since the AITC did not perform as well as people hoped for. In this period, BJP began their rise in the narrative of the country. In December, 2013 Sapam Keba joined BJP in the presence of Tapir Gao, Former MP from Arunachal Pradesh and in-charge of BJP Manipur and under the state BJP Presidentship of Th. Chaoba Singh, Former Union Minister. The joining of Sapam Keba to the BJP was well before Narendra Modi became the Prime Ministerial candidate and at a time when not many in Manipur were enthusiastic about joining the BJP.

References

Manipur politicians
Bharatiya Janata Party politicians from Manipur
Trinamool Congress politicians
1959 births
Living people
People from Imphal
Manipur MLAs 2022–2027
Manipur MLAs 2007–2012